The Whistle at Eaton Falls (also known by the alternative title Richer Than the Earth) is a 1951 American social drama film directed by Robert Siodmak and starring Lloyd Bridges and Dorothy Gish.

Plot
A newly promoted plant supervisor finds himself in the position of having to announce a layoff of his fellow workers.

Cast
 Lloyd Bridges as Brad Adams
 Dorothy Gish as Mrs. Doubleday
 Carleton Carpenter as Eddie Talbot
 Murray Hamilton as Al Webster
 James Westerfield as Joe London
 Lenore Lonergan as Abbie
 Russell Hardie as Dwight Hawkins
 Helen Shields as Miss Russell
 Doro Merande as Miss Pringle
 Diana Douglas as Ruth Adams
 Anne Francis as Jean London 
 Anne Seymour as Mary London
 Ernest Borgnine as Bill Street
 Arthur O'Connell as Jim Brewster
 Parker Fennelly as Issac
 Donald McKee as Daniel Doubleday
 Robert A. Dunn as Rev. Payson (as Rev. Mr. Robert A. Dunn)

Production
The film was going to be directed by Pat Jackson but they changed the script and he disliked the changes.

References

Bibliography

External links
 
 
 
 

1951 films
1950s English-language films
American drama films
Films directed by Robert Siodmak
Columbia Pictures films
Films shot in New Hampshire
1951 drama films
Films scored by Louis Applebaum
American black-and-white films
1950s American films